Blastobasis confamulella is a moth in the family Blastobasidae. It is found in the United States, including Texas.

References

Moths described in 1921
Blastobasis